Charles A. Andrew (died May 6, 1932) was a politician from Maryland. He served in the Maryland House of Delegates from 1904 to 1906 and the Maryland Senate from 1910 to 1912.

Career
Andrew was a Democrat. Andrew served in the Maryland House of Delegates, representing Harford County, from 1904 to 1906. He served in the Maryland Senate, representing Harford County, from 1910 to 1912.

In October 1917, Secretary of War Newton D. Baker appointed Andrew to a committee on awards to value the land the War Department purchased for the construction of Aberdeen Proving Ground. Andrew also worked as a coal and lumber dealer.

Personal life
Andrew married Julia Ann Jackson. They had two daughters, Estelle and Mary.

Andrew died on May 6, 1932, at the age of 74, at his home in Berkley in Harford County. He was buried at Darlington Cemetery.

References

Year of birth missing
1932 deaths
People from Harford County, Maryland
Democratic Party members of the Maryland House of Delegates
Democratic Party Maryland state senators